Elaine Breiger (born 1933) is an American painter and printmaker.

Born in Springfield, Massachusetts, Breiger studied at the Art Students League of New York and the Cooper Union, and worked with Krishna Reddy. She was also a member of The Society of American Artists.  She has exhibited widely, and received grants during her career from the New York State Council on the Arts and the National Endowment for the Arts, in 1974 and 1979 respectively. The Brooklyn Museum, the DeCordova Museum, the Honolulu Academy of Art, and the Library of Congress are among the institutions holding examples of her work.

References

1938 births
Living people
Artists from Springfield, Massachusetts
Painters from Massachusetts
Art Students League of New York alumni
Cooper Union alumni
20th-century American painters
21st-century American painters
20th-century American printmakers
21st-century American printmakers
20th-century American women artists
21st-century American women artists